Liridon Kalludra (born 5 November 1991) is a Swedish professional footballer who plays as a midfielder for Norwegian club Kristiansund.

Club career

Sarpsborg 08
On 30 September 2014, Kalludra signed his first professional contract with Tippeligaen side Sarpsborg 08 and this transfer would become legally effective in January 2015. On 6 April 2015, he was named as a Sarpsborg 08 substitute for the first time in a league match against Tromsø. His debut with Sarpsborg 08 came four days later in a 1–1 home draw against Vålerenga after coming on as a substitute at 765h minute in place of Henrik Ojamaa.

Return to Kristiansund
On 6 August 2015, Kalludra returned to OBOS-ligaen side Kristiansund. Three days later, he made his debut in a 1–0 home win against Fredrikstad after being named in the starting line-up.

International career
Born in Mitrovica and raised in Sweden. From 2006, until 2009, Kalludra has been part of Sweden at youth international level, respectively has been part of the U17 and U19 teams and he with these teams played 14 matches. In addition to Sweden, he has the right to represent his homeland, Kosovo at the international level.

Career statistics

Club

References

External links 

1991 births
Living people
Sportspeople from Mitrovica, Kosovo
Swedish men's footballers
Swedish expatriate footballers
Swedish expatriate sportspeople in Norway
Kosovan men's footballers
Kosovan expatriate footballers
Kosovan expatriate sportspeople in Sweden
Kosovan expatriate sportspeople in Norway
Association football midfielders
Superettan players
Ljungskile SK players
Norwegian Second Division players
Norwegian First Division players
Eliteserien players
Sarpsborg 08 FF players
Kristiansund BK players